This is a list of singles that reached number one on the Swiss Hitparade during the 1990s by week each reached the top of the chart.

Number-one singles

See also
1990s in music

References

Number-one singles
Switzerland
1990s